The Halveti Teqe is a Cultural Monument of Albania, located in Herebel, Diber County.

References

Cultural Monuments of Albania
Buildings and structures in Dibër (municipality)